The mastoid lymph nodes (retroauricular lymph nodes or posterior auricular glands) are a small group of lymph nodes, usually two in number, located just beneath the ear, on the mastoid insertion of the sternocleidomastoideus muscle, beneath the posterior auricular muscle.

Their mastoid lymph nodes receives lymph from the posterior part of the temporoparietal region, the upper part of the cranial surface of the visible ear and the back of the ear canal. The lymph then passes to the superior deep cervical glands.

Etymology 

References

External links
 Diagram at Baylor College of Medicine (listed as "retroauricular")

Lymphatics of the head and neck